Mary Helen Bowers (born 1979) is an American celebrity fitness guru, entrepreneur and former New York City Ballet dancer originally from Charlotte, North Carolina. She attended Alexander Graham Middle School in Charlotte, North Carolina before leaving for New York. She was a full scholarship student at the School of American Ballet in Manhattan at fifteen years old. One year later she was invited to join the New York City Ballet. She graduated with a Bachelor of Arts degree in English literature from Columbia University in New York City. She danced with the New York City Ballet for a decade.

On June 12, 2012, she released her book, Ballet Beautiful: Transform Your Body and Gain the Strength, Grace, and Focus of a Ballet Dancer. Her list of clients include Natalie Portman, Zooey Deschanel and Liv Tyler. Other celebrities include actresses Kirsten Dunst and Dakota Johnson, model Helena Christensen, Karen Elson, Sarah Sophie Flicker and Rachel Antonoff.

Bowers helped train actress Natalie Portman for the Oscar-winning performance in the 2010 movie, Black Swan. She is married to Paul Dans, a lawyer and a controversial Trump Administration appointee at the Office of Personnel Management (OPM) and the US Department of Housing and Urban Development, with whom she has a daughter.

References

External links
 
 

1979 births
American choreographers
Ballet choreographers
American ballerinas
Living people
Artists from Charlotte, North Carolina
Columbia University School of General Studies alumni
American exercise and fitness writers